K. M. Nazrul Islam is a Jatiya Party (Ershad) politician and the former Member of Parliament of Jessore-1.

Career
Islam was elected to parliament from Jessore-1 as a Jatiya Party candidate in 1988. He contested the 2001 election as a candidate of Islami Jatiya Oikya Front but lost the election to the Bangladesh Nationalist Party candidate.

References

Jatiya Party politicians
Living people
4th Jatiya Sangsad members
Year of birth missing (living people)